Ivan Losev may refer to:
 Ivan Losev (racewalker)
 Ivan Losev (mathematician)